Langvassbukta is a village in Kvæfjord Municipality in Troms og Finnmark county, Norway. The village is located on the west coast of the Gullesfjorden on the large island of Hinnøya. Langvassbukt Chapel is located in the village.

References

Kvæfjord
Villages in Troms